Carsidaridae is a bug family in the superfamily Psylloidea, with a world-wide (more southern hemisphere) distribution; the type genus Carsidara is from eastern Asia.

Genera
GBIF includes:
 Allocarsidara Hollis, 1987
 Carsidara Walker, 1869
 Crawfordella Enderlein, 1926
 Epicarsa Crawford, 1911
 Mesohomotoma Kuwayama, 1908
 Paracarsidara Heslop-Harrison, 1960
 Protyora Kieffer, 1906
 Synaphalara Yang, 1984
 Tenaphalara Kuwayama, 1908
 Thysanogyna Crawford, 1919
 Tyora Walker, 1869

References

External links 

Psylloidea
Hemiptera families